Team Illuminate is a women's professional road bicycle racing team which participates in elite women's races.

Team roster

National & Continental championships
2018
 Oceania U23 Time Trial, Mikayla Harvey

2021
 Japan Time Trial, Shoko Kashiki

2022
 Japan Time Trial, Shoko Kashiki
 Japan Road Race, Shoko Kashiki

References

External links

UCI Women's Teams
Cycling teams based in the United States
Cycling teams established in 2017